The 2008 Purdue Boilermakers football team represented Purdue University in the Big Ten Conference during the 2008 NCAA Division I FBS football season.  Joe Tiller, in his 12th and final season at Purdue, was the team's head coach.  The Boilermakers' home games were played at Ross–Ade Stadium in West Lafayette, Indiana.  They posted a 4–8 record, finishing in a ninth place tie in the Big Ten.

Schedule

Game summaries

Northern Colorado

Oregon

Kory Sheets rushed for an 80-yard touchdown for the Boilermakers and Matt Evensen kicked a 23-yard field goal for the Ducks. Chris Summers then kicked a 29-yard and a 38-yard field goals in the first quarter. Kory Sheets rush for 2 yards for a touchdown in the second quarter.

In the third quarter, Summers' punt was returned by Jairus Byrd for an 87-yard touchdown. Then LeGarrette Blount rushed for 5 yards for a touchdown to tie the score. Summers kicked a 27-yard field goal in the fourth quarter, but missed a field goal try to tie the game in regulation.

Both teams kicked a field goal in overtime, but the Boilermakers failed to score in the second overtime period.  The Ducks scored a touchdown to win the game.

Central Michigan

Notre Dame

Irish quarterback Jimmy Clausen threw for a career-high 275 yards and three touchdowns and Notre Dame running backs ran for 201 yards in the 38–21 defeat over the Boilermakers. Purdue took a 7–0 lead on a Kory Sheets run, but Notre Dame countered with a 47-yard interception return for a touchdown by cornerback Robert J. Blanton. Purdue answered back when Aaron Valentin scored on a 3-yard pass from Curtis Painter to make the score 14–7. Clausen threw a touchdown pass to Golden Tate to tie it 14–14 heading into half-time.

The Irish scored on their first two possessions of the second half to open a 28–14 lead. The Boilermakers cut the lead to 28–21 four plays later when Painter threw a pass that Desmond Tardy caught at the Notre Dame 30 and raced up the left sideline for a touchdown. The Irish answered immediately, however, when Clausen threw a 30-yard TD pass to David Grimes on a fourth-and-7. The Boilermakers fell to 1–15 at Notre Dame Stadium since 1976. The loss also left Joe Tiller with a 5–7 record against the Irish. (Purdue had lost 11 straight to Notre Dame before Tiller arrived.)

Penn State

The Nittany Lions defeated the Boilermakers 20–6, outgaining Purdue 422 to 241 in total offense.

Penn State quarterback Daryll Clark completed 18 of 26 passes for 226 yards and a ran for a touchdown on a quarterback sneak on 4th-and-goal in the second quarter for the first points of the game. Running back Evan Royster ran for 141 yards and a touchdown and also caught four balls for 53 yards.

Curtis Painter finished 13-for-22 for 112 yards but was replaced in the fourth quarter by backup Joey Elliott after throwing an interception to Nittany Lion safety Drew Astorino. Placekicker Chris Summers missed all three of his kick attempts—two field goal attempts and an extra point attempt. Kory Sheets' fourth-quarter touchdown run was Purdue's first offensive touchdown against Penn State since 2005.

Ohio State

Purdue managed to keep Ohio State's offense out of the end zone with OSU's only touchdown coming from a blocked punt. While the Purdue defense shut down Ohio State's Terelle Pryor and Beanie Wells, Ohio State's defense shut down Purdue's high powered offense. Purdue did manage to cut the lead to 13–3 in the third, but an Ohio State field goal restored the lead to 13. Ohio State stopped a late Purdue chance to make things interesting to hold on for the win.

Northwestern

Minnesota

Michigan

    
    
    
    
    
    
    
    
    
    
    
    
    

In his first collegiate start, third-string quarterback Justin Siller completed 21-of-34 passes for 266 yards and three touchdowns while rushing for 77 yards and another score. Kory Sheets rushed for 118 yards and tied a career-high with four touchdowns.

Michigan State

Iowa

Indiana

    
    
    
    
    
    
    
    
    
    
    
    

To finish a mostly dismal season for Purdue, the Boilermakers blew out arch-rival Indiana to reclaim the Old Oaken Bucket in Joe Tiller's final game. The win produced the largest ever margin of victory in the Bucket series.

Statistics

Team

Scores by quarter

Offense

Rushing

Passing

Receiving

Defense

Special teams

Statistics as of November 22, 2008 taken from Purdue CSTV

2009 NFL Draft

References

Purdue
Purdue Boilermakers football seasons
Purdue Boilermakers football